Newtown is a civil parish in County Westmeath, Ireland.

Newtown is one of eight civil parishes in the barony of Moycashel in the Province of Leinster.

Newtown civil parish comprises three population centres –  Ballynagore; Killavally; and Tyrrellspass (barony of Fartullagh) – and 24 townlands: Aghanamanagh aka Commeenlonagh; Aghyrassy; Ardmorney; Ballykilmore; Ballymachugh; Cloncrow; Cloncullen; Clonyhague; Cornaher; Cumminstown, Cumminstown; Garryduff, Garryduff; Higginstown, Higginstown; Kilcloghan; Killavally; Knockmore; Knockycosker; Loughanlewnaght; Newtownlow; Rahinashene and Spittaltown; Rahinashurock; Rahincuill; Rahinmore; Rathgarrett; and Torque. The townlands of Ballykilmore, Rahincuill and Rathgarrett are in the barony of Fartullagh.

The neighbouring civil parishes are: Castlelost and Clonfad (both in the barony of Fartullagh) to the north, Croghan (County Offaly) to the east, Rahugh (barony of Moycashel) to the south, Kilbeggan (Moycashel) to the west and Castletownkindalen to the west and north.

References

External links
Newtown civil parish at the IreAtlas Townland Data Base
Newtown civil parish at townlands.ie
Newtown civil parish at The Placenames Database of Ireland

Civil parishes of County Westmeath